Franz Eichberger (26 March 1913 – 31 December 2004) was an Austrian middle-distance runner. He competed in the men's 800 metres at the 1936 Summer Olympics.

References

1913 births
2004 deaths
Athletes (track and field) at the 1936 Summer Olympics
Austrian male middle-distance runners
Olympic athletes of Austria
Place of birth missing